Acmispon heermannii (formerly Lotus heermannii) is a species of legume (Fabaceae) known by the common names Heermann's bird's-foot trefoil and Heermann's lotus. It is native to the coastal plains, canyons, and mountains of California and Baja California, where it is known from several types of oceanside and inland habitat. It is a mat-forming perennial herb spreading straight stems along the ground. It is lined with leaves made up of several hairy oval leaflets. The inflorescence is a cluster of 3 to 8 flowers each up to about a centimeter long. The petals are yellow, often with dark lobes. The fruit is a curved, beaked legume pod.

The species was accepted by the Jepson eFlora , but regarded as the variety glabriusculus of Acmispon tomentosus by Plants of the World Online .

References

External links
Jepson Manual Treatment
USDA Plants Profile
Photo gallery

heermannii
Flora of Baja California
Flora of California
Flora without expected TNC conservation status